Eudemis brevisetosa is a moth of the family Tortricidae. It is found in Japan (Honshu, Iwate Prefecture, Kuriyagawa, Morioka)

The wingspan is 15–19 mm.

External links
 Japanese Moths

Moths of Asia
Moths described in 2005
Olethreutini
Moths of Japan